Semicassis bondarevi is a species of marine gastropod in the family Cassidae.

Distribution
This species occurs on the submarine Mascarene Plateau (primarily the Saya de Malha Bank) and southern Mozambique.; also off Papua New Guinea.

References

External links
 Abbott, R. T. (1993). Phalium (Semicassis) vector, a new deep-water species from the central Indian Ocean. Nautilus. 107(3): 94-96

Cassidae